Sarah Marietta Kingsley Cleveland (October 20, 1788 - 1856) was the first counselor to Emma Smith in the presidency of the Relief Society from 1842 to 1844.

Cleveland was born in Becket, Berkshire County, Massachusetts to Ebenezer Kingsley. She was married to John Cleveland and later to the Mormon prophet Joseph Smith. Her husband was a judge in Nauvoo, Illinois, and unlike her did not join the Church of Jesus Christ of Latter Day Saints; he was a Swedenborgian. Cleveland remained in Nauvoo with her husband when the main body of the Latter Day Saints moved to what later became Utah Territory.

Marriage to Joseph Smith
A letter from John L. Smith, Sarah Kingsley’s son-in-law, to the First Presidency, dated March 8, 1895, states: "In the days of Joseph. Mother [Sarah M. Kingsley (Howe)] Cleveland by advice, was sealed to the prophet in Nauvoo but lived with her [non-LDS] husband John Cleveland." Sarah was also resealed to Joseph Smith vicariously in the Nauvoo Temple in 1846.

Sources

Encyclopedia of Mormonism p. 1635.
2005 Deseret Morning News Church Alamanac (Deseret Morning News: Salt Lake City, Utah, 2004) p. 115

! colspan="3" style="border-top: 5px solid #FABE60;" |Church of Jesus Christ of Latter Day Saints titles

1788 births
1856 deaths
Converts to Mormonism
Counselors in the General Presidency of the Relief Society
Latter Day Saints from Illinois
Latter Day Saints from Massachusetts
People from Becket, Massachusetts
People from Nauvoo, Illinois